Sigurd Torbjørn Sørensen (1901 - 1981) was a Norwegian painter, best known for his landscapes. In his early days, he also made portraits.

Early life 
Sørensen was born September 7, 1901 in Antwerp. In 1914 Sørensen moved to Norway where his parents originally came from.

Training and education 
Even as a boy Sørensen stood out with his drawings at his school in Antwerp. (These drawings are still at the Antwerp school.)

Professor Wefring was his first art tutor. Later he joined the Oslo School for Arts and Crafts. Finally to complete his education, Sørensen was a disciple tutored by Carl von Hanro, Leon Aurdal and Per Krohg.

Art and career 
S. T. Sørensen is known for his Norwegian landscape paintings.

"In his "Forest Insides" Sørensen gives a well forward stream in motion or a Sunday quietness of the water, surrounded by lush vegetation and powerful trunks. All provide an harmonious unit with the Norwegian countryside."

S. T. Sorensen was usually represented in exhibitions at Blomqvist Art trading in Oslo.

References 

1901 births
1981 deaths
20th-century Norwegian painters
Norwegian male painters
20th-century Norwegian male artists